Periodic elections for the Tasmanian Legislative Council were held on 6 May 2017. The three seats up for elections were Launceston, Murchison and Rumney. They were previously contested in 2011.

Launceston
The seat of Launceston, based in the inland Tasmanian city of Launceston, has been held by independent member Rosemary Armitage since 2011.

Murchison
The west coast seat of Murchison has been held by independent member Ruth Forrest since 2005.

Rumney

The south-eastern seat of Rumney had been held by Tony Mulder since 2011. Mulder was defeated by the Labor candidate, Sarah Lovell.

References

External links
Tasmanian Electoral Commission website
Psephology commentary by Dr Kevin Bonham

2017 elections in Australia
2010s in Tasmania
Elections in Tasmania
May 2017 events in Australia